The National Women's Front (NWF) is the women's wing of the Popular Front of India, an organisation which has been banned for a period of five years by the Government of India under the Unlawful Activities (Prevention) Act since 28 September, 2022.

Programs and campaigns 
A workshop on Women Safety was organized by the National Women's Front at the India Islamic Cultural Center in New Delhi in 2013 where a participant noted that the main reason behind the December 2012 Nirbhaya Rape Case was alcohol and that to stop this kind of violence they should work on awareness campaign against alcohol.

In September of the same year National Women's Front organized the national campaign "Right to Hijab" across the country to create awareness about hijab and also promote the right to cultural identity.

In 2014, the NWF Delhi State unit held an International Women's Day celebration with their nationwide campaign "Women Representation – The Power to Empower".

In November of the same year, the NWF organised a conference ‘Awakening’ to debate issues concerning Indian women at Coimbatore. On the eve of the conference, an expo on women's rights and issues was inaugurated by Popular Front of India state president A.S.Ismail.  Graphic illustrations of domestic violence, rape, female foeticide and riots victims have been presented at the expo.

The Kerala State committee of National Women's Front organized a campaign against the Uniform Civil Code, as a part of national level of initiative to create awareness of the threat posed by the Code to the cultural diversity of India. They termed the Uniform Civil Code "anti-national" as it eliminates the diversity of different communities ultimately destroying Indian Nationalism. According to them it is a manifestation of anti-Muslim tendencies of Hindutva groups.

NWF conducts anti-dowry campaign across the nation on behalf of that it conducted Mohalla program in the year 2012.

Controversy 

In late 2017, videos from a sting operation of NWF president Zainaba AS showed that she admitted on camera that NWF was carrying out mass conversion to Islam at Sathya Sarini. Zainaba had earlier been questioned by NIA for her role in conversion of Hadiya/Akhila which was also termed a case of Love Jihad. Zaibana retracted her recorded statement and claimed that the allegations were fake. Following the sting operation, NIA questioned her for her involvement in the mass conversion.

References

External links 

Feminist organisations in India